Fossá is an abandoned village in the Faroe Islands. It lies on the island of Borðoy, slightly north of Norðdepil. It is at a place where several waterfalls join the sea, hence its name (cf. Faroese fossur 'waterfall'). Fossá was established in the 1860s as a settlement village, but nobody has lived there in recent years.

References

External links
 Picture of Fossá at Flickr

Former populated places in the Faroe Islands